In Desert and Wilderness is a popular young adult novel by the Polish author and Nobel Prize-winning novelist Henryk Sienkiewicz, written in 1911. It is the author's only novel written for children/teenagers. It tells the story of two young friends, Staś Tarkowski (14 years old) and Nel Rawlison (8 years old), kidnapped by rebels during the Mahdist War in Sudan. It was adapted for film twice, in 1973 and in 2001.

Plot

The story takes place in the late 19th century Egypt, during the Mahdist War. A 14-year-old Polish boy, Stanisław (Staś) Tarkowski, and 8-year-old English girl, Nel Rawlison, live with their fathers and grow up in the ton of Port Said. Their fathers are engineers who supervise the maintenance of the Suez Canal. One day, the Mahdist War begins in Sudan, led by a Muslim preacher, the Mahdi. Staś and Nel are captured as hostages by a group of Arabs who hope that they can exchange the children for Fatima, Mahdi's distant relative, who had been arrested by the British at the beginning of the novel.

Nel and Staś are forced to travel through the Sahara Desert to Khartoum, where they are to be presented to Mahdi. The journey is difficult and exhausting, especially for delicate and vulnerable Nel. Staś, who is a brave and responsible boy, protects his friend from the abductors' cruelty, even though that means that he is beaten and punished. His plans to escape fail and the children gradually lose their hope.

When the group arrive in Khartoum (precisely - Omdurman) the Arabs are disappointed by the fact that Mahdi, busy with leading the revolt, ignored their "mission" and turned down their offers. They take out their anger and frustration on the children. 

Staś is summoned to meet with the Mahdi and turns down the rebel leader's offer to convert to Islam. For that he is strongly reprimanded by another European captive, a Greek who did agree to convert in order to save his family and himself. The Greek tells Staś that such a forced conversion does not count since "God sees what is inside your heart" and that, by his intransigence, Staś may have doomed Nel to terrible death.   

Staś and Nel, exhausted by heat, thirst, hunger and poor treatment, live for some time in the city ruined by war, poverty and diseases. After a while the children and Arabs make another journey further south, to Fashoda.

One day the group encounters a lion who attacks them. The Arabs (who do not know how to fire a shotgun) hand the weapon to Staś and beg him to shoot the beast. Staś kills the lion, and then shoots down the Arabs as well. This is dictated by the despair and fury: the boy knows that the men were not going to set the children free. He hated the Arabs for abusing them – especially Nel.

Free of the Arabs, the children are marooned in the depth of Africa. They set out on an arduous journey through the African desert and jungle in the hope that sooner or later they would encounter European explorers or the British Army. The journey is full of dangers and adventures. The children, accompanied by two black slaves (a boy named Kali and a girl named Mea) whom Staś had freed from the Arabs, encounter a number of wonders and perils.

The children stop for a rest on a beautiful hill near a waterfall. They soon find out that a gigantic elephant has been trapped in a gully nearby. Nel, who loves animals, takes pity on the beast and saves it from starvation by throwing fruits and leaves into the gorge. The girl and the elephant (which is extremely intelligent and benign and whom Nel calls "King" because of its size) quickly become friends. 

Soon Nel is stricken with malaria and is about to die. Staś, mad with grief, decides to go to what he thinks is a Bedouin camp and beg for quinine. When he gets to the camp he find out that it belongs to an old Swiss explorer named Linde. The man had been severely injured by a wild boar and is waiting for death. All of his African servants have fallen ill to sleeping sickness and die one after another. Although horrified by this gruesome death camp, Staś becomes friend with Linde who generously supplies him with food, weapon, gunpowder and quinine. Thanks to the medicine, Nel recovers. Staś, grateful for Linde's help, accompanies the Swiss until the man's death. Then, using Linde's gunpowder, he frees King from the trap and they set out on a further journey.

Accompanying the children further on their journey is Linde's 12-year-old slave boy, Nasibu. The group sojourns on top of a small mountain mentioned by Linde before his death where Staś teaches Kali how to shoot. On a certain day, a furious gorilla on the mountain attacks Nasibu but he is rescued by their now-tamed elephant which attacks and kills the gorilla. Deciding that the mountaintop is no longer safe, the group move on to the village of Wa-Hima.

The tribes-people, seeing Staś riding upon an elephant, honor him and Nel as a Good Mzibu (a good spirit/goddess). The group stays in the village a short time, for Kali is by birthright the prince of the Wa-Hima tribe and therefore well-known. Staś is further venerated by the villagers when he kills the wobo (a black leopard) that was plaguing the village.

On reaching Kali's home village, the group learns that his tribe has been invaded by and attacked by their enemies since time immemorial, the Sambur tribe. Due to assistance from Kali's tribe and the guns carried by Staś and Nel, the war is won in the protagonist's favour. Because of his good nature, Staś and Nel command that the tribes-people of the Sambur tribe not be killed but rather united with the Wa-Hima. Staś urges the tribes to accept Christianity and live peacefully together.

Staś, Nel, Saba, King, Kali and 100 Sambur and Wa-Hima tribes-people move on to the east, which has not been mapped, in hope of reaching the Indian Ocean and being found by English explorers who might be searching for them. Kali has brought with him two witch doctors, M'Kunje and M'Rua, fearing that they might plot against him while he is away from home. However, it finishes tragically for the group: both of the witch doctors steal food and the last of the water but are soon found killed by either a lion or leopard.

Many of the tribes-people accompanying Nel and Staś die for lack of water. After the group has gone for at least three days without any water in the scorching dry desert, the children are saved at the last moment by two familiar officers who had recovered kites inscribed by Staś and Nel earlier in their plight describing their whereabouts and destination. The group is saved and is informed that Mahdi has died of a heart attack. Staś, Nel and Saba are reunited with their fathers and they return to Europe. Kali and his tribe members return to their settlement on Lake Rudolf. 

In a postscript it is told that, after growing up, Staś and Nel are married and visit their friends in Africa after ten years. Revisiting the places where they had trudged with so much difficulty and danger has become quick, easy and safe, since everything was taken over by the British Empire which started building railways.

Characters
 Nel Rawlison - 8-year-old English girl. She is very pretty and sweet. Although at the beginning of the novel she seems to be timid and shy, latershe shows that she can be courageous and stubborn. She treats Staś with respect and obedience, and often looks up to him.
 Stanisław Tarkowski (dim. Staś) - a 14-year-old Polish boy. At the beginning of the novel he seems to be a little bit scornful and bigheaded. However, as the dramatic events develop, it is revealed that Staś is extremely chivalrous and willing to sacrifice his own life to save Nel whom he loves like his own sister.
 Kali - African boy from Wa-hima tribe, Staś's servant who quickly becomes his friend. He faithfully serves his master and helps him to go through the dangers of Africa. Kali became popular when a Polish colloquial saying about double standard was coined around the so-called "Kali's morality": "If somebody takes Kali's cow, it's a bad deed. If Kali takes somebody's cow, it's a good deed."
 Mea - African girl from the Dinka tribe, Nel's servant. Shy and quiet, she loves her little mistress and protects her from dangers.
 Chamis - one of the kidnappers. Earlier a servant of Staś and Nel's fathers.
 Idris - a Beduin, one of the Mahdi's followers. Relatively well-behaved towards the children, he admired Staś's courage. He was tasked with bringing the children safely to the Mahdi.
 Gebhr - the cruel younger brother of Idris.
 Mrs. Oliver - Nel's teacher, a Frenchoman.
 Linde - Swiss explorer, encountered by Staś.
 Smain - husband of Fatma, relative of the Mahdi.
 Caliopuli - Greek worker employed by the Mahdi.
 Nasibu - servant of Linde, after his death he joined with the children on their further journeys.
 Faru - leader of the Samburs, the tribe opposing Kali's tribe.
 M'Kunje and M'Rua - witch doctors of Wa-Hima, hostile to Kali.
 Doctor Clary - relative of Nel.
 Captain Glen - met by Staś and Nel in the train.
 Władysław Tarkowski - Staś's widowed father, an engineer.
 George Rawlison - Nel's widowed father, a director of the Suez Canal Company.
 Fatma - a relative of the Mahdi. Her detention was the reason for the abduction of Staś and Nel.

Film adaptations

The first movie version was directed by Władysław Ślesicki in 1973. It lasts about three hours and is composed of two parts which were shown separately in theaters. Work on it started in 1971 and it was released in 1973. The movie was filmed in Egypt, Sudan and Bulgaria, with an international cast and crew. A mini-series was created at the same time. This version was shown in the U.S. on HBO in fall 1975.

The 2001 version was directed by Gavin Hood in only about three months. It was filmed in South Africa, Tunisia and Namibia. The original director fell ill at the very beginning of filming and his role was taken by Hood. A mini-series was made at the same time.

Follow-up stories by other authors
In 1961, a Polish writer and screenwriter Marian Brandys published Śladami Stasia i Nel (Following the path of Staś and Nel) and, in 1962 a related story, Z Panem Biegankiem w Abisynii (In Abyssinia with Mister Bieganek).
Władysław Ślesicki, the director of the 1973 movie released a book about making the movie, Z Tomkiem i Moniką w pustyni i w puszczy (In Desert and Wilderness with Tomek and Monika).
In 1993, Wojciech Sambory (a pen name for a writing team) wrote Powrót do Afryki (A Return to Africa), as a sequel to the novel (published by Reporter-Oficyna Wydawnicza).
The comic strip Nowe przygody Stasia i Nel (The New Adventures of Staś and Nel) from Piechur weekly magazine is another sequel to Sienkiewicz's novel. It was published online on Steampunk in 2005.
In 2017, Andrew Anzur Clement published in English the Keepers of the Stone trilogy, a continuation of Staś's and Nel's story partially inspired by Sienkiewicz's original work.

Other Polish children books related to Africa
 Alina i Czesław Centkiewiczowie - Tumbo z Przylądka Dobrej Nadziei (Tumbo from Cape of Good Hope)
 Kamil Giżycki - Nil - rzeka wielkiej przygody (Nile - River of Great Adventure)
 Kamil Giżycki - W pogoni za mwe (Chasing After mwe)
 Kamil Giżycki - W puszczach i sawannach Kamerunu (In Wilderness and Savannah of Cameroon)
 Wacław Korabiewicz - Kwaheri
 Ferdynand Antoni Ossendowski - Życie i przygody małpki (Monkey's Life and Adventures)
 Barbara Rybałtowska - Szkoła pod baobabem (School Under Adansonia)
 Alfred Szklarski - Tomek w grobowcach Faraonów (Tomek in Pharaohs' Tombs)
 Alfred Szklarski - Tomek na Czarnym Lądzie (Tomek on the Black Continent)

Poems
Murzynek Bambo by Julian Tuwim

See also
 Mahdist Sudan
 The Tragedy of the Korosko (novel with a similar theme)

References

External links
 (1917 Drezmal translation)
  (Mary Webb Artois translation)
 
The novel in Polish

1911 novels
Afro-Polish history
Anti-black racism in Europe
Polish novels
Novels by Henryk Sienkiewicz
Young adult novels
Polish novels adapted into films
Novels set in Sudan
Khartoum in fiction
Polish historical novels
Novels set in Africa
20th-century Polish novels
Polish children's novels
1911 children's books
Novels set during the Mahdist War